The Atlas des chemins vicinaux was produced in order to preserve the Belgian street network from possible usurpations. A law passed on 10 April 1841 led to the creation of an atlas of streets and roads in each town, to specify officially the Belgium public roads network. 

This atlas is still the only document which defines the public domain in Belgium.

References

External links
 Atlas presentation
 Law of 10 April 1841
 Legislation in streets and roads

Atlases